Suharno (1 October 1959 – 19 August 2015) was an Indonesian football coach who managed Arema Cronus from November 2013 until his death in August 2015.

Playing careers
He played 12 years as a footballer. He began his career in PS Banteng and is due to retire after three seasons playing for Niac Mitra.

Coaching careers

Niac Mitra
He began his coaching career in 1988 as player-assistant coach at Niac Mitra.

Gresik United
In August 2012 he signed a contract with Gresik United before he was sacked on 28 February 2013.

Persibo Bojonegoro
On 27 July 2013 he agreed to join Persibo Bojonegoro as a coach.

Death
He died on August 19, 2015, in Puskesmas Pakisaji, Malang. The cause of the death was because of a heart attack, after a training session at the Kanjuruhan Stadium.

Managerial statistics

Honours

Player
Niac Mitra
 Galatama: 1987–88

Manager
Gelora Dewata
 Piala Galatama: 1994

Arema Cronus
 East Java Governor Cup: 2013
 Indonesian Inter Island Cup: 2014/15

References

External links
 
 

1959 births
2015 deaths
Indonesian football managers
Indonesian footballers
Indonesia Super League managers
PKT Bontang managers
Persiwa Wamena managers
Gresik United managers
Arema FC managers
People from Klaten Regency
Association footballers not categorized by position
Association football coaches
Sportspeople from Central Java